The Indian Ocean gyre, located in the Indian Ocean, is one of the five major oceanic gyres, large systems of rotating ocean currents, which together form the backbone of the global conveyor belt. The Indian Ocean gyre is composed of two major currents: the South Equatorial Current, and the West Australian Current.

Normally moving counter-clockwise, in the winter the Indian Ocean gyre reverses direction due to the seasonal winds of the South Asian Monsoon. In the summer, the land is warmer than the ocean, so surface winds blow from the ocean to the land. However, during the winter, these temperatures reverse, making the winds blow from the land to the ocean.  Because most of the air pressure gradient is retained behind the Tibetan plateau, air pressure gradients over the Indian Ocean and the gyre are small. This results in winds of moderate strength, due to the protection from the full force winds blowing off the Mongolian high pressure region. Because of these moderate, dry winds, the Winter Monsoon season in the Indian Ocean region is the dry season for most of Southern Asia. Due to this seasonal wind cycle, the currents of the Indian Ocean, which make up the Indian Ocean gyre, are directly affected, causing reversal.

Garbage patch

References

External links
 Ocean currents

Oceanic gyres
Indian Ocean